Coelognathus is a genus of seven rat snakes from South and Southeast Asia that were formerly assigned to the genus Elaphe.  Based on morphological evidence and protein similarities, in 2001, Helfenberger revalidated the name Coelognathus that had originally been proposed by Leopold Fitzinger in 1843. The distinction between Coelognathus and Elaphe was further supported by mitochondrial DNA sequence and additional morphological evidence in 2005.

Species
These species are recognized:

Coelognathus enganensis 
Coelognathus erythrurus  – Philippine rat snake
Coelognathus flavolineatus  – yellow-striped rat snake
Coelognathus helena  – trinket snake
Coelognathus philippinus  – reddish rat snake
Coelognathus radiatus  – copperhead rat snake
Coelognathus subradiatus  - Indonesian rat snake

Nota bene: A binomial authority in parentheses indicates that the species was originally described in a genus other than Coelognathus.

References

Further reading
Fitzinger L. 1843. Systema Reptilium, Fasciculus Primus, Amblyglossae. Vienna: Braumüller & Seidel. 106 pp. + indices. (Coelognathus, new genus, p. 26). (in Latin).

Rat snakes
Colubrids
Snake genera
Taxa named by Leopold Fitzinger